Alan Dzhemalovich Khubetsov (born 26 June 1993) is a Russian judoka of Ossetian ethnicity. He is the 2017 European gold medalist in the 81 kg division.  Khubestov is also a lieutenant in the Russian army.

References

External links
 

1993 births
Russian male judoka
Living people
European Games bronze medalists for Russia
Judoka at the 2015 European Games
European Games medalists in judo
Judoka at the 2019 European Games
European Games gold medalists for Russia
Judoka at the 2020 Summer Olympics
Olympic judoka of Russia
Sportspeople from Vladikavkaz
21st-century Russian people